The Losail International Circuit or Lusail International Circuit (Arabic: حلبة لوسيل الدولية) is a motor racing circuit located just outside the city of Lusail, north of Doha, Qatar.

Built in just under a year by 1,000 workers at the cost of  million, the track opened in 2004, named Losail International Circuit, to the inaugural 2004 Qatar motorcycle Grand Prix, won by Sete Gibernau.

It is surrounded by artificial grass to stop the sand encroaching on the track.

In 2007, Lusail added permanent outdoor lighting for night races. At the time, the lighting of the Lusail Circuit by Musco Lighting was the largest permanent venue sports lighting project in the world, a distinction that now belongs to another Persian Gulf motorsport venue, Yas Marina Circuit in Abu Dhabi. The first night race in MotoGP history was the 2008 Qatar motorcycle Grand Prix in March 2008.

In February 2009, a GP2 Asia Series nighttime race took place. The World SBK visited Losail in 2005–2009 and 2014–2019; and the WTCC visited there in 2015–2017.

The circuit hosted the 20th race of the 2021 Formula One season, the inaugural edition of the Qatar Grand Prix.

Lap records
The official lap record for the current circuit layout is 1:23.196, set by Max Verstappen driving for Red Bull Racing in the 2021 Qatar Grand Prix. The official race lap records at the Lusail International Circuit are listed as:

Events

 Current
 October: Formula One Qatar Grand Prix
 November: Grand Prix motorcycle racing Qatar motorcycle Grand Prix, Asia Talent Cup

 Future
 FIA World Endurance Championship 6 Hours of Qatar (2024)

 Former
 Asia Road Racing Championship (2010–2015)
 FIM Endurance World Championship 8 Hours of Doha (2007–2012)
 GP2 Asia Series (2009)
 Grand Prix Masters (2006)
 Grand Prix motorcycle racing Doha motorcycle Grand Prix (2021)
 Motocross World Championship (2013–2017)
 MRF Challenge Formula 2000 Championship (2014)
 Porsche GT3 Middle East Championship (2012–2015)
 Speedcar Series (2009)
 Superbike World Championship (2005–2009, 2014–2019)
 World Touring Car Championship FIA WTCC Race of Qatar (2015–2017)

Racing history

Formula One

MotoGP

Superbike World Championship

World Touring Car Championship

Motocross World Championship

Speedcar Series

GP2 Asia

References

External links

Official website
Trackpedia's guide to driving the Losail International Circuit
 Google maps satellite view of Losail International Circuit

Grand Prix motorcycle circuits
Superbike World Championship circuits
Motorsport venues in Qatar
World Touring Car Championship circuits
Qatar Grand Prix
Formula One circuits